The Primetime Emmy Award for Outstanding Short Form Comedy, Drama or Variety Series was first awarded at the 63rd Primetime Creative Arts Emmy Awards in 2011 as Outstanding Short-Format Live-Action Entertainment Program. The award was divided in 2016 to recognize Outstanding Short Form Comedy or Drama Series and Outstanding Short Form Variety Series. Starting in 2021, the categories were combined again and renamed Outstanding Short Form Comedy, Drama or Variety Series.

Winners and nominations

2010s

2020s

References

Primetime Emmy Awards